The Thai League 1 is managers (head coaches) in Thai football league system.

Current Thai League 1 managers

By nationality

Thai League 1 title-winning managers

By nationality

See also
List of foreign Thai League 1 managers

External links
Official Website

Thai League 1 managers